{{DISPLAYTITLE:C4H6N4}}
The molecular formula C4H6N4 (molar mass: 110.12 g/mol, exact mass: 110.0592 u) may refer to:

 Diaminopyrimidines
 2,4-Diaminopyrimidine
 4,5-Diaminopyrimidine

Molecular formulas